Tatyana Alexeyevna Chudova (16 June 1944 – 23 November 2021) was a Russian composer. She was born in Moscow and studied at the Central Music School in Moscow and then at the Moscow Conservatory. After completing her studies, she took a teaching position at the Conservatory. On 21 June 2007, she was awarded the title of Honored Master of Arts of the Russian Federation.

Works
Selected works include:
Symphony Ab. 1, 'Timur and his team'''O myorvoy tsaverne i semi bojatiryakh, opera, 1966-7Na derevnyu dedushke, opera, 1978Bible Suite for organLast lullaby with oboe soloThree Circles for solo celloTrombone sonataFrom Russian Fairytales Suite for orchestraConcerto for piano and orchestra No.1Concerto for piano and orchestra No.2Concerto for OrchestraViolin sonata Suite for organThe Warriors CantataCantata about MoscowThe Architects for chorus and orchestraConcert Toccata for pianoSymphony No.1Symphony No.2Symphony No.3''

Her music has been recorded and issued on CD, including:
Organ Music by Moscow Composers - Pedagogues of Moscow Conservatory - From the Sources to the Present - Anthology Vol. 1

References

External links
 

1944 births
2021 deaths
20th-century classical composers
Russian music educators
Russian classical composers
Russian women classical composers
Pupils of Tikhon Khrennikov
Women music educators
20th-century women composers
21st-century classical composers
21st-century women composers
20th-century Russian musicians
20th-century Russian women musicians
21st-century Russian musicians
Musicians from Moscow
Moscow Conservatory alumni
Academic staff of Moscow Conservatory
20th-century Russian women